A code-talker paradox  is a situation in which a language prevents communication.  As an issue in linguistics, the paradox raises questions about the fundamental nature of languages. As such, the paradox is a problem in philosophy of language. 

The term code-talker paradox was coined in 2001 by Mark Baker to describe the Navajo code talking used during World War II. Code talkers are able to create a language mutually intelligible to each other but completely unintelligible to everyone who does not know the code. This causes a conflict of interests without actually causing any conflict at all. In the case of Navajo code-talkers, cryptanalysts were unable to decode messages in Navajo, even when using the most sophisticated methods available. At the same time, the code talkers were able to encrypt and decrypt messages quickly and easily by translating them into and from Navajo. Thus the code talker paradox refers to how human languages can be so similar and different at once: so similar that one can learn them both and gain the ability to translate from one to the other, yet so different that if someone knows one language but does not know another, it is not always possible to derive the meaning of a text by analyzing it or infer it from the other language.

Baker solves the paradox with the theory of universal grammar. Within universal grammar, there are certain parameters that are shared by all languages. Languages differ from one another in that a given parameter may have different settings across languages. The number of possible combinations of parameter settings accounts for the diversity of human languages, and the fact that every human brain is wired to process the same parameters means that to learn a new language, the brain simply adapts what it already knows. The brain recognizes the parameters of the first language to which it was exposed and when it processes a different language, it simply changes the values of corresponding parameters. Hence human languages vary greatly from one to the other, yet each human has the theoretical capacity to learn, converse in, and translate to and from, any human language.

See also
Drift (linguistics)
List of paradoxes
Plato's Problem
The Analysis of Verbal Behavior
Philip Johnston

References
 Baker, Mark C. The Atoms of Language: The Mind's Hidden Rules of Grammar. Basic Books, 2001.

Philosophy of language
History of cryptography
Paradoxes